Lakshmibai National College of Physical Education (LNCPE) is part of the academic wing of the Sports Authority of India, and is situated at Kariavattom, Thiruvananthapuram, Kerala, India. It was founded on 17 August 1985 under the auspices of the Department of Youth Affairs and Sports, Ministry of Human Resource Development, Government of India. The college provide facilities for the promotion of physical education, sports and teacher training by offering undergraduate and post-graduate research courses.

See also 
 Sport in India

Notable alumni 
 Chitharesh Natesan, Mr. Universe, 2019

References

External links
 

Colleges in Thiruvananthapuram
Sport schools in India
Sport in Kerala
Sports universities and colleges